Marina Ricolfi-Doria (born 12 February 1935) is a Swiss former water skier. She competed three times at the Water Ski World Championships winning gold medals in 1955 and in 1957. She won the overall title in the European Water Ski Championships consecutively from 1953 to 1956 and won five Swiss national titles. She was inducted into the International Water Ski Federation Hall of Fame in 1991.

She is the wife of Vittorio Emanuele di Savoia, the son of the last king and queen of Italy, Umberto II and Marie José. They have one son, Emanuele Filiberto di Savoia.

Career 

Ricolfi-Doria was born in Geneva on 12 February 1935; her parents were Iris Benvenuti and René Ricolfi-Doria, a Swiss Olympic athlete.
In 1955 she became a water-skiing performer at Cypress Gardens, in Florida in the United States. She competed three times in the Water Ski World Championships; in 1953, in 1955 and in 1957. In 1955 she took the Tricks gold medal, and in 1957 she took gold in both Slalom and Tricks, thus becoming the overall women's world champion.  She won the overall title in the European Championships every year from 1953 to 1956, and took five or more overall Swiss national titles. In 1991 Ricolfi-Doria was included in the Hall of Fame of the International Water Ski Federation, as the "finest female skier from Europe of the first decade of international competition". She continued to compete until 1960.

Marriage 

Ricolfi-Doria met Vittorio Emanuele di Savoia in 1960 at the Société Nautique de Genève, where both were water-skiing. They were married in a Roman Catholic church in Tehran, Iran, in the autumn of 1971; their wedding had been announced during the 2500-year celebration of the Persian Empire in Persepolis. They have one son, Emanuele Filiberto di Savoia.

As the wife of the head of the House of Savoy, she is entitled to the Privilège du blanc, the ability to wear white when in an audience with the pope. She used the privilege on 18 May 2003 during a Catholic mass marking the birth anniversary of Pope John Paul II.

References 

Living people
1935 births
Italian princesses
Hereditary Princesses of Naples
Neapolitan princesses
Duchesses of Savoy
Princesses of Savoy
Female water skiers
Swiss water skiers
Italian water skiers
Swiss-Italian people
Swiss people of Italian descent
Swiss people of French descent
Swiss Roman Catholics
Citizens of Italy through descent
Sportspeople from Geneva
Princesses by marriage